Karkuse may refer to several places in Estonia:
Karkuse, Tapa Parish, village in Lääne-Viru County, Estonia
Karkuse, Vinni Parish, village in Lääne-Viru County, Estonia